20 Ophiuchi is a class F6IV (yellow-white subgiant) star in the constellation Ophiuchus. Its apparent magnitude is 4.64 and it is approximately 104 light years away based on parallax. It lies near the star Zeta Ophiuchi.

20 Ophiuchi is an astrometric binary. The primary star is a late F-type subgiant star. It has a mass 1.72 times that of the Sun. The companion star regularly perturbs the primary star, causing it to wobble around the barycenter. From this, an orbital period of 35.5 years has been calculated. The secondary star is 0.8 times the mass of the Sun, and it may be a white dwarf or red dwarf.

References

Ophiuchus (constellation)
F-type subgiants
BD-10 4394
Ophiuchi, 20
082369
6243
151769
Astrometric binaries